The National Public Housing Museum is a historical institution that will be opening at 1322 W Taylor St. in Chicago, Illinois, and currently is located at 625 N Kingsubury St. in Chicago. The museum is located in the last remaining building of the Jane Addams Homes of ABLA Homes, and will feature an oral history archive, public programming, and an entrepreneurship hub. Exhibitions will include restored apartment of three families who lived in the Jane Addams homes. The building that the museum is contained within opened in 1938 as the first federal government housing project in Chicago. It housed thousands of families over six decades and has been vacant since 2002

History 
The movement for conservation of a public housing building began in the 1990s with the announcement of the Plan for Transformation, a Chicago Housing Authority initiative to demolish 17,000 units of public housing and replace them with mixed-income housing. Residents, led by Deverra Beverly, a former commissioner for the Chicago Housing Authority, began and led the movement for the creation of a memorialization of their presence.  Beverly and other public housing residents approached Sunny Fischer, a philanthropy professional and former public housing resident herself, with their proposal for a museum. Along the way, CHA residents were joined by "civic leaders, preservationists, historians, and cultural experts who also wanted to create a new architectural landmark to recognize an important historic site." This group came together to preserve and transform the current site of the museum, originally designed by a team of architects led by John Holabird. As the project moved forward, the museum maintained a commitment to uplifting the voices and narratives of public housing residents, and includes public housing residents as about a third of its board.

Exhibits, collections and programming  
The mission of the museum is to “promote, interpret, and propel housing as a human right” . This mission manifests in the museums oral history-focused approach to storytelling and community development and programming.  The museum’s planned exhibitions and collections include an archive of oral histories of public housing residents, three restored apartments of three diverse (One Russian Jewish, one Italian-American, and one African American) families that lived in the public housing based on the oral histories of Inez Medor, members of the Rizzi family, and Marshall Hatch,  and a community space for discussion and interpretation.  Prior to opening, the museum served largely as a “museum in the streets” and hosted events like neighborhood storytelling and poetry readings, beautification projects at the site of the museum, and panels across the country. Most recently, National Public Housing Museum has partnered with Oral History Summer School to help train a group of activists, organizers, students, and artists in how to collect and utilize the medium of oral history, while additionally expanding the museum’s archival collection of oral histories. The museum has not yet determined if it will devote a significant amount of resources to growing and maintaining a collection. As a member of the International Coalition of Sites of Conscience, the museum holds a responsibility to not only historicize its focus but also connect the focus to current struggles and initiatives.

The museum used the examples of the Apartheid Museum, District Six Museum, the Tenement Museum and the Jane Addams Hull-House Museum as inspiration.

See also 

 Museum of Homelessness

References

External links 
 Official website
 Podcast episode about the National Public Housing Museum, featuring associate director Robert J. Smith III

Museums in Chicago
Historic house museums in Illinois